The Nigerian National Assembly delegation from Ebonyi State comprises three Senators and six Representatives.

Assemblies

6th Assembly

The 6th National Assembly (2007–2011) was inaugurated on 5 June 2007.
Senators representing Ebonyi State in the 6th Assembly were:

Representatives in the 6th Assembly were:

7th Assembly

The 7th Nigeria National Assembly (2011–2015) was inaugurated on 6 June 2011.
Senators representing Ebonyi State in the 7th Assembly were:

Representatives in the 7th Assembly were:

8th Assembly

The 8th National Assembly (2015 till 2019) 
Senators representing Ebonyi State in the 8th Assembly are:[3]

9th Assembly

The 9th National Assembly (2019 till date) 
Senators representing Ebonyi State in the 9th Assembly are:[3]

References

Politics of Ebonyi State
National Assembly (Nigeria) delegations by state